Tiden is the Norwegian word for "the time". It may refer to:

 Tiden (newspaper), Norwegian newspaper, published 1808–11 and 1813–14
 Tiden (magazine), Swedish theoretical political magazine
 , Norwegian newspaper, published 1906-41 and 1945-82
 Drammens Tidende, Norwegian newspaper, formerly called Tiden, published starting 1832
 Tiden Norsk Forlag, Norwegian publisher